Pablo Guillermo Arraya (born 21 October 1961) is a former tennis player from Peru.

Arraya was born in Córdoba, Argentina, and moved to Peru at a young age with his family. He began playing tennis at 9 years old and turned professional in 1980. He represented his native country at the 1992 Summer Olympics in Barcelona, where he was defeated in the first round by Argentina's Javier Frana. He won one career title in singles. He reached his highest singles ATP-ranking on 13 August 1984, when he became the number 29 of the world. He was the first player beaten by Andre Agassi in the main draw of a Grand Slam tournament at the French Open in 1987. His sister is Laura Arraya, a former tennis player. He is now a trainer and owner of the Arraya Tennis Academy in Key Biscayne.

Career finals

Singles (1 title, 4 runner-ups)

Doubles (1 title, 3 runner-ups)

Arraya Tennis Academy
Arraya Tennis Academy was first opened in Lima, Peru in 1980. Laura Arraya and Heinz Gildemeister direct the academy in Peru. The location in Key Biscayne was opened in 1992 and is managed by Gildemeister and Arraya. The academy offers training for beginners and advanced, an after school program, cardio tennis and a summer program.

References

External links
 
 
 

1961 births
Living people
Sportspeople from Córdoba, Argentina
Peruvian male tennis players
Tennis players at the 1992 Summer Olympics
Olympic tennis players of Peru
20th-century Peruvian people
21st-century Peruvian people